Catherine Millot (born 1944) is a French Lacanian psychoanalyst and author, professor of psychoanalysis at the University of Paris-VIII.

Millot studied philosophy before turning to psychoanalysis. In 1971 she started an eight-year analysis with Lacan, and attended his seminars from 1971 until his death. Her thesis, turned into the book Freud anti-pédagogue, argued that pedagogy could not be based on psychoanalysis, since the role of analyst involved a radical openness to lack which was incompatible with the role of teacher.  In 1975 she started teaching in the department of psychoanalysis at Paris VIII.

In 1983 in her book Horsexe, she asserted her belief that transgender women's gender identity is "psychotic" and relies inappropriately on ideals and stereotypes of femininity.

Works
 Freud anti-pédagogue, 1979
 Horsexe. Essai sur le transsexualisme, 1983. Translated as Horsexe. Essay on Transsexuality, 1990
 Nobodaddy. L'hystérie dans le siècle, Distribution Distique, 1988
 La vocation de l'écrivain, Gallimard, 1991
 Gide, Genet, Mishima. L'intelligence de la perversion, Gallimard, 1997
 Abîmes ordinaires, 2001
 La vie parfaite. Jeanne Guyon, Simone Weil, Etty Hillesum, 2006
 Ô solitude, 2011

References

1944 births
Living people
French psychoanalysts
Place of birth missing (living people)
Academic staff of the University of Paris